Richard Munden (c. 25 June 1680 – 19 December 1725) was a British Army officer and politician  who sat in the House of Commons from 1708 to 1710. He served in the War of Spanish Succession and in the Jacobite rebellion.

Early life
Munden was the posthumous son of Sir Richard Munden of Bromley St  Leonard's, a captain in the Royal Navy, and his wife Susanna Gore. He broke with the family's naval tradition and was commissioned as a captain in the 1st Foot Guards in 1702. He served at the Battle of Blenheim in 1704, and  after obtaining promotion to colonel in  1706, he fought later that year at the Battle of Ramillies. In  1708, he  was given his own regiment.

Career
In the spring of 1708, Munden was ordered with his troops to England and at the 1708 British general election he was returned as Member of Parliament for Camelford. He was absent from  Parliament on military service for much of the time and he did not stand at the 1710 British general election.  

Munden was taken prisoner at the Battle of Brihuega in December 1710,and remained in Spain until the peace negotiations. Although  promoted to brigadier-general in 1712, his regiment was disbanded and he was placed on half-pay in that year. In 1715 he raised a regiment of horse and became colonel of the 13th Light Dragoons. He  fought at the Battle of Preston against the Jacobite rebels. In 1716, he received arrears for his service in the Iberian Peninsula and was placed on the general staff of the Irish establishment. He served from 1722 as Colonel  of the 8th Dragoons from 1722 and took part in the funeral procession of the Duke of Marlborough in August 1722.

Death and legacy
Munder died in service  in Dublin, on 19 September 1725.

References

 Richard Cannon, Historical Record of the 13th Dragoons, 1842. page 82
 Eveline Cruickshanks, MUNDEN, Richard (c.1680-1725), of Bromley St. Leonard’s, Chelsea, Mdx. in The History of Parliament: the House of Commons 1690-1715, 2002.

1680 births
1725 deaths
British Army generals
Grenadier Guards officers
13th Hussars officers
8th King's Royal Irish Hussars officers
Members of the Parliament of Great Britain for English constituencies
British MPs 1708–1710